Handball Club Baník Karviná or HCB Karviná is a Czech handball club based in Karviná, Czech Republic. Baník Karviná is one of the most successful handball clubs in the country, having won the Chance Extraliga twelve times.

History 
The club was founded in 1952. HCB Karviná win the first title in 1968 in Czechoslovak second league and 1972 win in Czechoslovak first league. Club played in EHF Champions League in 2001, 2002, 2003, 2004, 2005, 2006, 2007, 2008 and EHF Cup in 1997, 1998, 1999, 2010, 2019 and 2020. The club has won the Czech Handball Extraliga twelve times, of which the last time was in 2022. The club competed in EHF Champions League and EHF Cup on several occasions.

Crest, colours, supporters

Club crest

Kit manufacturers

Kits

Management

Team

Current squad 

Squad for the 2022–23 season

Technical staff
 Head coach:  Michal Brůna
 Fitness coach:  Dominik Lukács
 Physiotherapist:  Daniel Jaroš
 Masseur:  David Hála
 Club doctor:  Dr. Ľubomír Pacanovský

Transfers

Transfers for the 2022–23 season

Joining 
  Martin Galia (GK) from  Górnik Zabrze
  Adam Ptáčník (LB) from  TJ Sokol Nové Veselí
  Jonáš Patzel (CB) from  HSG Nordhorn-Lingen
  Zdenek Čadra (RB) from  KH Kopřivnice
  Jan Plaček (RW) from  TJ Cement Hranice

Leaving 
  Jan Sobol (RW) (retires)
  Nemanja Marjanović (GK) to  RK Dinamo Pančevo
  Jiří Tabara (GK) to  MHK Karviná
  Vojtěch Patzel (CB) to  VfL Lübeck-Schwartau
  Slavomír Mlotek (CB) to  SKP Frýdek-Místek
  Kristián Galia (LP) to  HC ROBE Zubří
  Artur Urbański (RB)

Previous squads

Accomplishments 

 Czech Handball Extraliga:
 : 2000, 2001, 2002, 2004, 2005, 2006, 2007, 2008, 2009, 2010, 2018, 2022
 : 1997, 1998, 2019, 
 : 1994, 1996, 2012
Czechoslovakia Handball League:
 : 1968, 1972, 
 : 1967, 1987, 1990, 1992,
 : 1969, 1974, 1976, 1988, 1991,

European record

EHF ranking

Former club members

Notable former players

  František Brůna (1961–1976)
  Michal Brůna (2000–2002, 2003–2004, 2017–2020)
  Luděk Drobek (1993–2004)
  Martin Galia (1997–2003, 2022–)
  Richard Hladký (1994–1996)
  Pavel Horák (1996–2006)
  David Juříček (1992–2003)
  Arnošt Klimčík (1964–1977)
  Tomáš Mrkva (2006–2010)
  Vojtěch Patzel (2020–2022)
  Martin Prachař (1997–2006)
  Pavel Prokopec (2000–2004)
  Alexander Radčenko (1999–2003)
  Miloš Slabý (2000–2004)
  Jan Sobol (2001–2007, 2021–2022)
  Ondřej Šulc (2006–2010)
  Jakub Szymanski (2001–2006)
  Marek Vančo (2009–2016)
  Ondřej Zdráhala (2002–2007)
  Krzysztof Łyżwa (2009–2011)
  Przemysław Witkowski (2016–2017)
  Veljko Inđić (2006–2008)
  Nemanja Marjanović (2005–2008, 2017–2022)
  Miloš Putera (2004–2006)

References

External links
 
 

Czech handball clubs
Handball clubs established in 1955
1955 establishments in Czechoslovakia
Karviná